Giuseppe Piamontini (1664 - 1742) was an Italian sculptor, born and active in Florence. He initially trained with Giovanni Battista Foggini, but then spent five years working with Ercole Ferrata.

Works

References

1664 births
1742 deaths
Sculptors from Florence
17th-century Italian sculptors
Italian male sculptors
18th-century Italian sculptors
18th-century Italian male artists